Robert Alleyne (25 March 1847 – 25 July 1886) was a Barbadian cricketer. He played in one first-class match for the Barbados cricket team in 1871/72.

See also
 List of Barbadian representative cricketers

References

External links
 

1847 births
1886 deaths
Barbadian cricketers
Barbados cricketers
People from Saint John, Barbados